The following is a list of current Kontinental Hockey League (KHL)  team rosters

 Ak Bars Kazan
 Amur Khabarovsk
 Avangard Omsk
 Avtomobilist Yekaterinburg
 Barys Nur-Sultan
 CSKA Moscow
 Dinamo Minsk
 Dinamo Riga
 Dynamo Moscow
 Jokerit
 Kunlun Red Star
 Lokomotiv Yaroslavl
 Metallurg Magnitogorsk
 Metallurg Novokuznetsk
 Neftekhimik Nizhnekamsk
 Salavat Yulaev Ufa
 Severstal Cherepovets
 Sibir Novosibirsk
 SKA Saint Petersburg
 HC Sochi
 Spartak Moscow
 Torpedo Nizhny Novgorod
 Traktor Chelyabinsk
 HC Vityaz

Current rosters
Kontinental Hockey League